Cheshire Kat Productions is a commercial film production company founded by actress Michelle Rodriguez and her long-time friend and business partner, Giancarlo Chersich. The company produced the film Stuntwomen: The untold Hollywood Story (2019). Directed by April Wright, it won the award for Best Documentary By or About Women conferred by the Women Film Critics Circle for 2020.

References

External links
Michelle Rodriguez Official Website

Film production companies of the United States